The International Energy Agency Energy in Buildings and Communities (IEA EBC) Programme, formerly known as the Energy in Buildings and Community Systems Programme (ECBCS), is one of the International Energy Agency's Technology Collaboration Programmes (TCPs). The Programme "carries out research and development activities toward near-zero energy and carbon emissions in the built environment".

History 
The programme was formally launched in 1977, following the oil crisis which drove research into alternative sources of energy and technologies to improve energy efficiency. Since then, IEA EBC's main aim has been to provide an international focus for energy efficiency research in the building sector, with its current mission being to “develop and facilitate the integration of technologies and processes for energy efficiency and conservation into healthy, low emission and sustainable buildings and communities, through innovation and research”.

Former EBC Executive Committee Chairs 
Andreas Eckmanns, Bundesamt für Energie, Switzerland
Morad R. Atif, National Research Council, Canada
Richard Karney, Department of Energy, USA
Sherif Barakat, National Research Council, Canada
Gerald S. Leighton, Department of Energy, USA

EBC Strategic Plan 
Every five years, the IEA Committee on Energy Research and Technology (CERT) renews the Programme's Strategic Plan. The latest EBC Strategic Plan was developed in 2019 and is effective until 2024.

The strategic objectives of the EBC TCP are:
the refurbishment of existing buildings;
reducing the performance gap between design and operation;
creating robust and affordable technologies;
the development of energy efficient cooling;
the creation of district level solution sets.

EBC Participating Countries 
Countries currently participating in the EBC are Australia, Austria, Belgium, Brazil, Canada, P.R. China, Denmark, Finland, France, Germany, Ireland, Italy, Japan, Republic of Korea, Netherlands, New Zealand, Norway, Portugal, Singapore, Spain, Sweden, Switzerland, Turkey, United Kingdom and the United States of America.

EBC Annexes 
The EBC carries out research and development (R&D) projects known as Annexes, with a typical duration of 3 to 4 years forming the Programme's basis. “The outcomes of the Annexes address the determining factors for energy use in three domains: technological aspects, policy measures, and occupant behaviour”. Below is a list with completed and current  Annexes.

Completed 
Annex 1: Load Energy Determination of Buildings (1977-1980)
Annex 2: Ekistics and Advanced Community Energy Systems (1976-1978)
Annex 3: Energy Conservation in Residential Buildings (1979-1982)
Annex 4: Glasgow Commercial Building Monitoring (1979-1982)
Annex 6: Energy Systems and Design of Communities (1979-1981)
Annex 7: Local Government Energy Planning (1981-1983)
Annex 8: Inhabitants Behaviour with Regard to Ventilation (1984-1987)
Annex 9: Minimum Ventilation Rates (1982-1986)
Annex 10: Building HVAC System Simulation (1982-1987)
Annex 11: Energy Auditing (1982-1987)
Annex 12: Windows and Fenestration (1982-1986)
Annex 13: Energy Management in Hospitals (1985-1989)
Annex 14: Condensation and Energy (1987-1990)
Annex 15: Energy Efficiency in Schools (1988 - 1990)
Annex 16: Building Energy Management Systems (BEMS) 1- User Interfaces and System Integration (1987-1991)
Annex 17: Building Energy Management Systems (BEMS) 2- Evaluation and Emulation Techniques (1988-1992)
Annex 18: Demand Controlled Ventilation Systems (1987-1992)
Annex 19: Low Slope Roof Systems (1987-1993)
Annex 20: Air Flow Patterns within Buildings (1988-1991)
Annex 21: Environmental Performance (1988-1993)
Annex 22: Energy Efficient Communities (1991-1993)
Annex 23: Multi Zone Air Flow Modelling (COMIS) (1990-1996)
Annex 24: Heat, Air and Moisture Transport (1991-1995)
Annex 25: Real time HVAC Simulation (1991-1995)
Annex 26: Energy Efficient Ventilation of Large Enclosures (1993-1996)
Annex 27: Evaluation and Demonstration of Domestic Ventilation Systems (1993-1997 + extension to 2003)
Annex 28: Low Energy Cooling Systems (1993-1997)
Annex 29: Daylight in Buildings (1995-1999)
Annex 30: Bringing Simulation to Application (1995-1998)
Annex 31: Energy-Related Environmental Impact of Buildings (1996-1999)
Annex 32: Integral Building Envelope Performance Assessment (1996-1999)
Annex 33: Advanced Local Energy Planning (1996-1998)
Annex 34: Computer-Aided Evaluation of HVAC System Performance (1997-2001)
Annex 35: Design of Energy Efficient Hybrid Ventilation (HYBVENT) (1998-2002)
Annex 36: Retrofitting of Educational Buildings (1999-2003)  
Annex 37: Low Exergy Systems for Heating and Cooling of Buildings (LowEx) (1999-2003)
Annex 38: Solar Sustainable Housing (1999-2003)
Annex 39: High Performance Insulation Systems (2001-2005)
Annex 40: Building Commissioning to Improve Energy Performance (2001-2004)
Annex 41:Whole Building Heat, Air and Moisture Response (MOIST-ENG) (2003-2007)
Annex 42: The Simulation of Building-Integrated Fuel Cell and Other Cogeneration Systems (FC+COGEN-SIM) (2003-2007)
Annex 43: Testing and Validation of Building Energy Simulation Tools (2003-2007)
Annex 44: Integrating Environmentally Responsive Elements in Buildings (2004-2011)
Annex 45: Energy Efficient Electric Lighting for Buildings (2004-2010)
Annex 46: Holistic Assessment Tool-kit on Energy Efficient Retrofit Measures for Government Buildings (EnERGo) (2005-2010)
Annex 47: Cost-Effective Commissioning for Existing and Low Energy Buildings (2005-2010)
Annex 48: Heat Pumping and Reversible Air Conditioning (2005-2011)
Annex 49: Low Exergy Systems for High Performance Buildings and Communities (2005-2010)
Annex 50: Prefabricated Systems for Low Energy Renovation of Residential Buildings (2006-2011)
Annex 51: Energy Efficient Communities (2007-2013)
Annex 52: Towards Net Zero Energy Solar Buildings (2008-2014)
Annex 53: Total Energy Use in Buildings: Analysis & Evaluation Methods (2008-2013)
Annex 54: Integration of Micro-Generation & Related Energy Technologies in Buildings (2009-2014)
Annex 55: Reliability of Energy Efficient Building Retrofitting - Probability Assessment of Performance & Cost (RAP-RETRO) (2010-2015)
Annex 56: Cost Effective Energy &  Emissions Optimization in Building Renovation  
Annex 57: Evaluation of Embodied Energy &  Equivalent Emissions for Building Construction (2011-2016)
Annex 58: Reliable Building Energy Performance Characterisation Based on Full Scale Dynamic Measurements (2011-2016)
Annex 59: High Temperature Cooling & Low Temperature Heating in Buildings (2012-2016)
Annex 60: New Generation Computational Tools for Building & Community Energy Systems 
Annex 61: Business and Technical Concepts for Deep Energy Retrofit of Public Buildings
Annex 62: Ventilative Cooling
Annex 63: Implementation of Energy Strategies in Communities
Annex 64: LowEx Communities - Optimised Performance of Energy Supply Systems with Exergy Principles 
Annex 65: Long-Term Performance of Super-Insulating Materials in Building Components and Systems
Annex 66: Definition and Simulation of Occupant Behavior in Buildings 
Annex 67: Energy Flexible Buildings 
Annex 68: Indoor Air Quality Design and Control in Low Energy Residential Buildings
Annex 71: Building Energy Performance Assessment Based on In-situ Measurements
Annex 76 / SHC Task 59: Deep Renovation of Historic Buildings Towards Lowest Possible Energy Demand and  Emissions
Annex 77 / SHC Task 61: Integrated Solutions for Daylight and Electric Lighting 
Working Group - Energy Efficiency in Educational Buildings (1988 - 1990)
Working Group - Indicators of Energy Efficiency in Cold Climate Buildings (1995-1999)
Working Group - Annex 36 Extension: The Energy Concept Adviser for Technical Retrofit Measures (2003-2005)

Current 
Annex 5: Air Infiltration and Ventilation Centre
Annex 69: Strategy and Practice of Adaptive Thermal Comfort in Low Energy Buildings
Annex 70: Energy Epidemiology: Analysis of Real Building Energy Use at Scale 
Annex 72: Assessing Life Cycle Related Environmental Impacts Caused by Buildings 
Annex 73: Towards Net Zero Energy Public Communities 
Annex 74: Competition and Living Lab Platform
Annex 75: Cost-effective Building Renovation at District Level Combining Energy Efficiency & Renewables
Annex 78: Supplementing Ventilation with Gas-phase Air Cleaning, Implementation and Energy Implications
Annex 79: Occupant Behaviour-Centric Building Design and Operation
Annex 80: Resilient Cooling
Annex 81: Data-Driven Smart Buildings
Annex 82: Energy Flexible Buildings Towards Resilient Low Carbon Energy Systems
Annex 83: Positive Energy Districts
Annex 84: Demand Management of Buildings in Thermal Networks
Annex 85: Indirect Evaporative Cooling
Annex 86: Energy Efficient Indoor Air Quality Management in Residential Buildings
Annex 87: Energy and Indoor Environmental Quality Performance of Personalised Environmental Control Systems
Working Group - Communities and Cities
Working Group - HVAC Energy Calculation Methodologies for Non-residential Buildings
Working Group - Building Energy Codes

EBC publications 
The EBC Programme produces a series of scientific publications. 
Outcomes and summary reports (for policy and decision makers) of the various running and completed projects are published when available.   
The EBC newsletter “EBC News” is published twice per year, including feedback from running and forthcoming Annexes as well as other articles in the field of energy use for buildings and communities.
The EBC Annual Report outlines the Programme's yearly progress, including among others separate sections summarizing the status and available deliverables for each Annex.

References

External links
International Energy Agency - Energy in Buildings and Communities Programme
International Energy Agency - Energy in Buildings and Communities Programme – On-going projects
International Energy Agency - Energy in Buildings and Communities Programme – Completed projects
International Energy Agency - Energy in Buildings and Communities Programme – EBC News
International Energy Agency - Energy in Buildings and Communities Programme – Annual Reports
International Energy Agency - Energy in Buildings and Communities Programme – Summary Reports
International Energy Agency - Energy in Buildings and Communities Programme – Project Reports
International Energy Agency Technology Collaboration Programmes (TCPs)
International Energy Agency

 
International energy organizations
Energy conservation
Low-energy building
Energy policy